James (John) Edward Hanauer (1850–1938) was an author, photographer, and Canon of St. George's Cathedral in Jerusalem.

Biography
Descended from Swiss and Jewish ancestors, he was born in Jaffa in what was then Ottoman Syria; he moved to Jerusalem at an early age.

Career
Hanauer was employed by Charles Warren's expedition to the Transjordan, as a translator and assistant photographer, the beginning of his interest in research on the antiquities and folklore of the region and leading to his involvement with the Palestine Exploration Fund. His papers and correspondence were published in the Quarterly Statement of that British society after 1881, which also issued his booklet Table of the Christian and Mohammedan Eras in 1904; he was supplied with high quality photographic equipment to supplement his productions. Some of his collection of photographs were reproduced in his 1910 work, Walks about Jerusalem; his brother and son were also active in this field. In 1907 his Folk-lore of the Holy Land: Moslem, Christian and Jewish was published in London.

References

Bibliography (partial list)

(pref. 1904): A table of the Christian and the Mohammedan eras from July 15th, A.D. 622, the date of the Hejira, to A.D. 1900
(1904): Tales told in Palestine
(1907): Folk-lore of the Holy Land. Moslem, Christian and Jewish
Alternative:  Folk-lore of the Holy Land. Moslem, Christian and Jewish
(1910): Walks about Jerusalem

1850 births
1938 deaths
Folklorists
Palestinian Anglican priests
19th-century photographers
Palestinian photographers
Early photographers in Palestine